Jim Gartner is an American politician and retired businessman serving as a member of the Kansas House of Representatives from the 53rd district. Elected in 2016, he assumed office on January 9, 2017.

Education 
Gartner earned a Bachelor of Business Administration from Washburn University in 1974.

Career 
Prior to entering politics, Gartner worked as an employee of Southwestern Bell for 30 years, retiring as vice president of external affairs. He served in the United States Marine Corps for three years during the Vietnam War. Gartner also served as a member and president of the Auburn–Washburn USD 437.

In 2016, Gartner was selected by 53rd district Democratic precinct committee-members to replace Annie Tietze in a special election. Gartner was later elected to a full term in November 2016. Since 2019, he has served as a minority whip of the Kansas House of Representatives.

Personal life 
Gartner lives in Topeka, Kansas.

References 

Living people
Washburn University alumni
Democratic Party members of the Kansas House of Representatives
People from Topeka, Kansas
21st-century American politicians
Year of birth missing (living people)